Edison Machado Coelho (born ), better known as Neguinho, is a Brazilian futsal player who plays as a winger for Bintang Timur Surabaya and the Brazil national futsal team.

Honours
Pato Futsal
Liga Sul de Futsal: 2018
Liga Nacional de Futsal: 2018, 2019

Bintang Timur Surabaya
Indonesia Pro Futsal League: 2021-22
AFF Futsal Cup: 2022

Brazil
Copa América de Futsal: 2017

References

External links
Liga Nacional de Futsal profile
The Final Ball profile

1992 births
Living people
Brazilian men's futsal players